Towers in Time is an out-of-print collectible card game by Thunder Castle Games that was released in April 1995. The base set had 150 cards with 56-card starter decks and 8-card booster packs. In 1996, the game was repackaged as a dedicated deck card game to be sold in a box set of 150 cards. Thunder Castle Games announced at least four expansions for the game but none of them ever materialized: Greek, Zodiac, Amazon, and Norse.

The game was chastised for having starter decks that contained no rules, and instead players would have to call a non-toll-free number to obtain the rules. The rules were eventually printed in Scrye magazine issue #3. An "icon explanation" card, however, was included in the starter decks, but did not explain all the icons found on the cards. 

Gameplay depicted the two players as wizards battling between dimensions. Players won by destroying his opponent's Five Shields with creatures, with each shield capable of taking 4 points of damage. There were 6 schools of color: Fire, Water, Air, Earth, White, and Black.

References

Further reading

Collectible card games
Card games introduced in 1995